Old Man Markley is a punk & bluegrass band based out of Los Angeles, CA. Founded in 2007, the band consisted of John Carey (lead vocals, guitar), Annie DeTemple (Autoharp, Vocals), Alex Zablotsky (Mandolin), Jeff Fuller (Drums), Joey Garibaldi (Bass, Vocals), Ryan Markley (Washboard), John Rosen (Banjo, Vocals), and Katie Weed (Fiddle). The band was signed to Fat Wreck Chords in 2010, but has largely been inactive since 2015.

History
The band was formed in late 2007 in the San Fernando Valley area of Los Angeles.  They were named after washboard player (and former drummer for Angel City Outcasts) Ryan Markley, and played their first show in 2008 at a bar in Pasadena called the Old Towne Pub. The show was attended by an at-capacity crowd and the bar sold out of beer. The band's debut album "Guts n' Teeth" released on Fat Wreck Chords on January 18, 2011. The band's first EP was a 7" released on Fat Wreck Chords with the A-Side being "For Better, For Worse" and the B-Side was a cover of the Screeching Weasel song "The Science Of Myth".

Members as of 2015
 John Carey -  guitar, vocals
 Annie DeTemple - autoharp, vocals
 Jeff Fuller - drums
 Joey Garibaldi - bass, vocals
 Ryan Markley - washboard
 John Rosen - banjo
 Katie Weed - fiddle

Discography

Albums

EPs

Music videos
 "For Better, For Worse" (2011)
 "In a Circle Going Round" (2011)
 "Too Soon for Goodnight" (2013)
 "Train Of Thought" (2014)

References

External links

Old Man Markley's Myspace
Fat Wreck Chords Old Man Markley Bio

Fat Wreck Chords artists
Punk rock groups from California
American bluegrass music groups
Musical groups from Los Angeles